Sporting Clube da Praia, short form: Sporting Praia (Capeverdean Crioulo, ALUPEC or ALUPEK as well as Badiu: Sporting Klubi di Praia) is a Capeverdean football club based in Praia and plays at Estádio da Várzea (sometimes in English as Várzea Stadium). The club was founded on 2 December 1923 and affiliate to the Portuguese club Sporting CP (also as Sporting Lisbon), the first made in Cape Verde and under the Portuguese rule, and played their first competitive match in early 1953.

The club has won a total of about 37 official tier-one and regional trophies, the championship titles (3 colonial, 9 national and 20 regional), 3 listed regional cup titles, 2 listed super cup titles (1 national and 1 regional) and 3 listed opening tournament titles.

Sporting Praia was the first Cape Verdean club to compete at the continentals, the greatest appearance was the First Round at the continental championships, the last was the CAF Champions League.

Seasons

Performance in African competitions

1 Sporting Praia withdrew
2 Sporting Praia withdrew due to the Guinean Civil War

Colonial era

National championships
Partial list from 1984 to 1998

2-U: A club who finished second and in the second place ranking (best of three), ranked as a non-participant in the playoff stage which the club has been eliminated from as they finished in one of the last two positions

Island/Regional Championships
Listing from 2002, up to 2002, it was the standings of the Santiago Regional Championships

1Promoted to the single regional championship match and then the national championships after defeating the North Zone winner Desportivo Santa Cruz
2As Sporting Praia was also national champion in the previous season, the club was already promoted

Notes and references